Bush lawyer may refer to the following:

Bush lawyer (plant), one of several New Zealand climbing plants in the genus Rubus, especially Rubus cissoides
(Australian and New Zealand usage) person not qualified in law who attempts to expound on legal matters
A poem by Banjo Paterson
A mining agent in New Zealand (historical)